The 1921 Columbus Panhandles season was their second in the newly formed American Professional Football Association (soon to become the National Football League). The team failed to improve on their previous output of 2–6–2, winning only one league game. They finished seventeenth in the league.

Schedule

Games in italics are against non-NFL teams and do not contribute to the league standings.

Standings

References

Columbus Panhandles seasons
Columbus Panhandles
Columbus Panhandles